Pedro López may refer to:

Sports
Pedro Hugo López (1927–1959), Chilean footballer
Pedro López Jiménez (born 1942), Spanish businessman and vice chairman of Real Madrid football club
Pedro López (footballer, born November 1983), Spanish footballer
Pedro López (footballer, born August 1983), Spanish footballer
Pedro Michel López (born 1984), Dominican MLB baseball player
Pedro López (footballer, born 1995), Spanish football goalkeeper
Pedro López (footballer, born 1997), Spanish footballer
Pedro López (manager) (born 1979), Spanish football manager

Others
Pedro López de Monforte (fl. 1103–1135), Spanish nobleman and governor
Pero López de Ayala (1332–1407), Spanish poet and statesman
Pedro López (painter) (fl. 1608), Spanish painter
Pedro López Lagar (1899–1977), Spanish-born Argentine film actor
Pedro T. López (1906–1957), Filipino politician
Pedro Alonso López (born 1948), Colombian serial killer and rapist
Pedro López Quintana (born 1953), Spanish Roman Catholic archbishop and diplomat
Pedro López (serial killer) (born 1948), Colombian serial killer and child molester

See also
Pedro Lopes (disambiguation)